The 2005 Tercera División play-offs to Segunda División B from Tercera División (Promotion play-offs) were the final playoffs for the promotion from 2004–05 Tercera División to 2005–06 Segunda División B. In some groups four teams took part in the play-off while other groups have only three.

The teams highlighted in yellow played the Liguilla de Ascenso to Segunda Division B.
The teams highlighted in red were relegated to Regional Divisions.

Groups A
Teams from Galicia, Asturias, Castile and León and Madrid.

Group A1
1st Eliminatory:

2nd Eliminatory:

Promoted to Segunda División B:Real Oviedo

Group A2
1st Eliminatory:

2nd Eliminatory:

Promoted to Segunda División B:Negreira

Group A3
1st Eliminatory:

2nd Eliminatory:

Promoted to Segunda División B:Valladolid B

Group A4
1st Eliminatory:

2nd Eliminatory:

Promoted to Segunda División B:Móstoles

Groups B
Teams from Cantabria, Basque Country, Navarre and Aragon.

Group B1
1st Eliminatory:

2nd Eliminatory:

Promoted to Segunda División B:Portugalete

Group B2
1st Eliminatory:

2nd Eliminatory:

Promoted to Segunda División B:Cultural Durango

Group B3
1st Eliminatory:

2nd Eliminatory:

Promoted to Segunda División B:Zalla

Group B4
1st Eliminatory:

2nd Eliminatory:

Promoted to Segunda División B:Racing B

Groups C
Teams from Catalonia, Valencian Community, Balearic Islands and Region of Murcia.

Group C1
1st Eliminatory:

2nd Eliminatory:

Promoted to Segunda División B:Sant Andreu

Group C2
1st Eliminatory:

2nd Eliminatory:

Promoted to Segunda División B:L'Hospitalet

Group C3
1st Eliminatory:

2nd Eliminatory:

Promoted to Segunda División B:Reus

Group C4
1st Eliminatory:

2nd Eliminatory:

Promoted to Segunda División B:Águilas

Groups D
Teams from Andalusia, Extremadura, and Castile-La Mancha.

Group D1
1st Eliminatory:

2nd Eliminatory:

Promoted to Segunda División B:Mérida

Group D2
1st Eliminatory:

2nd Eliminatory:

Promoted to Segunda División B:Baza

Group D3
1st Eliminatory:

2nd Eliminatory:

Promoted to Segunda División B:Villanueva

Group D4
1st Eliminatory:

2nd Eliminatory:

Promoted to Segunda División B:Cerro Reyes

External links
Segunda División B Play-Off 2004-05 on Futbolme.com

2004-05
play
2005 Spanish football leagues play-offs